The National Soccer League 1985 season was the ninth season of the National Soccer League in Australia.   The season was again played with two Conferences as separate leagues, followed by a conference playoff final.  The Grand Final was won by Brunswick Juventus over Sydney City.

League tables
Northern Conference

Southern Conference

Finals series
Northern Conference

Southern Conference

Grand Final

Brunswick Juventus win 2-0 on aggregate

Individual awards

Player of the Year: Graham Honeyman (West Adelaide SC) 
U-21 Player of the Year: Alan Hunter (Brisbane Lions SC)
Top Scorer(s): Charlie Egan (South Melbourne) - 21 goals)
Coach of the Year: Eddie Thomson (Sydney City)

References
OzFootball Archives - 1985 NSL Season

National Soccer League (Australia) seasons
1
Aus